João Crisóstomo de Abreu e Sousa (27 January 1811, in Lisbon – 7 January 1895, in Lisbon) was an army general who became the Prime Minister of Portugal between 14 October 1890 and 17 January 1892 in a non-partisan government organized by the Liga Liberal (Liberal League).

References

1811 births
1895 deaths
Naval ministers of Portugal
People from Lisbon
Prime Ministers of Portugal
19th-century Portuguese politicians